Big Sandy Independent School District is a public school district based in Big Sandy, Texas (USA). The district is located in southwestern Upshur County and extends into a small portion of Wood County.

Finances
As of the 2010-2011 school year, the appraised valuation of property in the district was $177,403,000. The maintenance tax rate was $0.104 and the bond tax rate was $0.028 per $100 of appraised valuation.

Academic achievement
In 2011, the school district was rated "academically acceptable" by the Texas Education Agency.

Schools
In the 2011-2012 school year, the district had four open schools.

Regular instructional
Big Sandy High School
Big Sandy Junior High
Big Sandy Elementary

Alternative instructional
Upshur County Alternative School

Special programs

Athletics

The Big Sandy High School football team has won three Texas Class B (now Class A) state championships; 1973, 1974 (co-championship with Celina after the finals game ended in a 0-0 tie), and 1975. The 1975 team set a then national record of 824 points scored in a season (they went 14-0 for the regular season including playoffs), while giving up only 15 points (and only being behind in a game only one time, an early 2-0 deficit to Groom in the championship game, which also were the only points given up to any opponent in its three state title games). This record was not broken until 1994 by a high school in Bloomington, California. The 1975 team included later notable NFL stars such as David Overstreet, a former running back for the Oklahoma Sooners and the Miami Dolphins, and Lovie Smith, head coach for the NFL Chicago Bears.

In 2005, the Wildcats again reached the state final game (Class A, vs Stratford), however they fell short by one point (21-20).

See also

List of school districts in Texas

References

External links

School districts in Upshur County, Texas
School districts in Wood County, Texas